Seonbi or sŏnbi were scholars during the Goryeo and Joseon periods of Korea who served the public without a government position, choosing to pass up positions of wealth and power to lead lives of study and integrity. Those who chose to serve the government were obliged to assist the king in governing the nation properly, and once out of office, led a quiet life in the countryside, teaching and leading the people in the right direction. Today, Seonbi is a figurative word for a learned man who does not covet wealth but values righteousness and principles. It is also used as a metaphor for a well-behaved and gloomy person. To today's young South Koreans who do not have a high opinion of Confucianism, Seonbi is used to refer to a geezer or a person with anachronistic value system.

Philosophy
The seonbi followed a strict code of conduct and believed they had the moral duty to lead society in the right direction. Seonbi were to live life in modesty and perpetual learning in order to attain perfection of character, not only through knowledge but also by adhering to the rightful path. The goal of the seonbi was to achieve social justice.

Seonbi were expected to possess the Confucian virtues of filial piety and loyalty to the king, disdain power, wealth and private interest, and be ready to lay down their life in order to remain faithful to their principles and maintain their  integrity. They venerated scholars such as Jeong Mong-ju (who died for his fidelity to Goryeo), the six martyred ministers (who refused to accept Sejo's usurpation of the throne), and Jo Gwang-jo (a reformer who died trying to transform Joseon into an ideal Confucian society) as embodiments of the seonbi spirit and as examples to follow.

Education was of great importance and referred to as "enlightenment", and seonbi gathered and studied at seowon institutions. Seonbi masculinity denotes mental attainment rather than physical performance, and is still valued by many South Koreans and considered by some scholars to be the ideal model of Korean masculinity.

The seonbi had deep sympathy for the hardships of the common class. In their pursuit of social justice, the seonbi submitted blunt petitions to the king despite the dangerous consequences and suffered many purges as a result. Due to their reputation for integrity and incorruptibility, the seonbi were idealized and romanticized in popular imagination as men of honor in contrast to the ruling yangban class, even though seonbi came from the same class. The seonbi was a common figure in traditional Korean depictions of the Joseon period. For instance, a seonbi appears as one of the characters in the traditional mask dance preserved at the Hahoe Folk Village, where he competes with a yangban character, often depicted as corrupt and greedy.

Modern depictions
Modern depictions of seonbi in popular media are ubiquitous, with some examples being:
 Lee Joon-gi in the Korean drama The Scholar Who Walks the Night
 Kim Soo-hyun in the Korean drama My Love from the Star
 Bae Yong-joon in the Korean film Untold Scandal
 the seonbi mascot in the game Crossy Road
 Cho Jae-hyun in the Korean drama Jeong Do-jeon

Famous seonbi

 Choe Chiwon
 Choi Ik-hyun
 Heo Gyun
 Jo Sik
 Jeong Cheol
 Jeong Do-jeon
 Jeong Mong-ju
 Jeong Yak-yong
 Jo Gwang-jo
 Kim Jeong-hui
 Kim Su-hang
 Park Ji-won

 Seo Gyeong-deok
 Seong Hon
 Song Ik-pil
 Song Jun-gil
 Song Si-yeol
 Yi Gi
 Yi Hang-ro
 Yi Hwang
 Yi I
 Yi Su-gwang
 Yun Seon-do

See also
Korean culture
Korean Confucianism
Silhak
Neo-Confucianism
Yangban

References

External links

Joseon dynasty
Korean Confucianism